Frank Wheadon Crider (March 18, 1907 – February 6, 1962) was an American football player and coach. He was an all-conference halfback and team captain for the 1929 Oklahoma Sooners football team. He was an assistant coach for the Sooners in 1945. Crider served as the head football coach at East Central University in Ada, Oklahoma from 1946 to 1950.

Head coaching record

References

External links
 

1907 births
1962 deaths
American football halfbacks
Oklahoma Sooners football players
Oklahoma Sooners football coaches
East Central Tigers football coaches
Players of American football from Georgia (U.S. state)